AUH or AuH may refer to:

 Abu Dhabi International Airport (IATA airport code: AUH), United Arab Emirates
 Aurora Municipal Airport (Nebraska) (FAA airport code: AUH), United States
 AUH (gene)